Eremophila muelleriana, commonly known as round-leaved eremophila, is a flowering plant in the figwort family Scrophulariaceae, and is endemic to Western Australia. It is an open shrub with light-coloured new foliage, broad leaves and deep purple-violet flowers.

Description

The petals are deep purple to reddish violet on the outside and white, sometimes with purple spots on the lower part of the inside. The outside of petal tube and lobes is hairy while the inside of the lobes is glabrous and the inside of the tube is filled with long hairs. The 4 stamens are fully enclosed in the petal tube.

Taxonomy and naming
Eremophila muelleriana was first formally described in 1934 by Charles Gardner from a specimen collected near Kalli, west of Cue. The description was published in Journal of the Royal Society of Western Australia. The specific epithet (muelleriana) honours Ferdinand von Mueller.

Distribution and habitat
Round-leaved eremophila is only found in a small area north-east of Meekatharra, between Mount Narryer and Yalgoo in the Gascoyne and Murchison biogeographic regions where it grows clay-sand in mulga woodland.

Conservation
This species is classified as "Priority Three" by the Western Australian Government Department of Parks and Wildlife meaning that it is poorly known and known from only a few locations but is not under imminent threat.

Use in horticulture
This eremophila is a particularly striking plant in flower with its deep purple to almost black flowers and it is an attractive and hardy plant in a container. Propagation from cuttings is slow but in drier places it grows well on its own roots. It can also be propagated by grafting onto Myoporum rootstock. A well drained soil in a sunny position are preferred as the plant is susceptible to frost damage. It does respond well to regular pruning.

References

Eudicots of Western Australia
muelleriana
Endemic flora of Western Australia
Plants described in 1934
Taxa named by Charles Gardner